Artelinic acid (or its salt, artelinate) is an experimental drug that is being investigated as a treatment for malaria.  It is a semi-synthetic derivative of the natural compound artemisinin.  Artelinic acid has a lower rate of neurotoxicity than the related artemisinin derivatives arteether and artemether, but is three times more toxic than artesunate.  At present, artelinic acid seems unlikely to enter routine clinical use, because it offers no clear benefits over the artemesinins already available (artesunate and artemether).  Artelinic acid has not yet been evaluated for use in humans.

References

Antimalarial agents
Benzoic acids
Organic peroxides
Trioxanes
Heterocyclic compounds with 3 rings